John Filmer may refer to:

Jack Filmer (John Francis Filmer, 1895–1979), Australian-born New Zealand scientist
Sir John Filmer, 4th Baronet (1716–1797), MP for Steyning
Sir John Filmer, 7th Baronet, of the Filmer baronets

See also
Filmer, surname